Eagleman may refer to:

 David Eagleman (born 1971), American neuroscientist and author
 Eagleman (comics), a DC Comics character
 'Eagle Man', the mascot of the low budget Eagle Insurance commercials

English-language surnames